Pit bull is a term used in the United States for a type of dog descended from bulldogs and terriers, while in other countries such as the United Kingdom the term is used as an abbreviation of the American Pit Bull Terrier breed. The term was first used in 1927. Within the United States the pit bull is usually considered a heterogeneous grouping that includes the breeds American Pit Bull Terrier, American Staffordshire Terrier, American Bully, Staffordshire Bull Terrier and occasionally the American Bulldog, along with any crossbred dog that shares certain physical characteristics with these breeds. In other countries including Britain, the Staffordshire Bull Terrier is not considered a pit bull. Most pit bull-type dogs descend from the British Bull and terrier, a 19th-century dog-fighting type developed from crosses between the Old English Bulldog and the Old English Terrier.

Pit bull-type dogs have a controversial reputation as pets both in the United States and internationally, due to their history in dog fighting, the number of high-profile attacks documented in the media over decades, and their proclivity to latching on while biting. Proponents of the breed and advocates of regulation have engaged in a nature-versus-nurture debate over whether apparent aggressive tendencies in pit bulls may be appropriately attributed to owners' care for the dog or inherent qualities. Numerous advocacy organizations have sprung up in defense of the pit bull. Some studies have argued that the type is not disproportionately dangerous, offering competing interpretations on dog bite statistics. Independent organizations have published statistics based on hospital records showing pit bulls are responsible for more than half of dog bite incidents among all breeds despite comprising 6% of pet dogs. Some insurance companies will not cover pit bulls (along with rottweilers and wolf hybrids) because these particular breeds cause a disproportionate rate of bite incidents. Dog bite severity varies by the breed of dog, and studies have found that pit bull-type dogs have both a high rate of reported bites and a high rate of severe injuries, compared to other breeds.

Pit bull-type dogs are extensively used in the United States for dogfighting, a practice that has continued despite being outlawed. A number of nations and jurisdictions restrict the ownership of pit bull-type dogs through breed-specific legislation. A pro-pit bull lobby exists that spends millions of dollars a year promoting pit bulls as family pets, funding pro-pit bull researchers, and opposing laws that regulate their ownership.

History 

It is believed all dogs that are now classified as pit bulls descend from the British bull and terrier, which were first imported into North America in the 1870s. The bull-and-terrier was a breed of dog developed in the United Kingdom in the early 19th century for the blood sports of dog fighting and rat baiting, it was created by crossing the ferocious, thickly muscled Old English Bulldog with the agile, lithe, feisty Black and Tan Terrier. The aggressive Old English Bulldog, which was bred for bear and bull baiting, was often also pitted against its own kind in organised dog fights, but it was found that lighter, faster dogs were better suited to dogfighting than the heavier Bulldog. To produce a lighter, faster more agile dog that retained the courage and tenacity of the Bulldog, outcrosses from local terriers were tried, and ultimately found to be successful.

As it was in the United Kingdom, dog fighting became a popular pastime in 19th century America and bull-and-terriers were imported to the New World to pursue the blood sport. In the United States organised dog fights have been progressively outlawed in various states since 1874, culminating in federal legislation criminalising animal fighting in 2007.

In the 1890s breeders of American pit bull-type dogs attempted to have their dogs recognised by the American Kennel Club, but because of the type's association with dogfighting, the club rejected these entreaties. Following this rejection, in 1898 breeders of American Pit Bull Terriers established a rival kennel club, the United Kennel Club. In addition to being a breed registry, the United Kennel Club also regulated dogfights. In the 1930s the American Kennel Club was faced with a dilemma, whilst not wishing to condone dogfighting there was a desire to recognise a uniquely American dog breed for which over 30 years of breed records existed. The solution was to recognise Pit Bull Terriers under a different name and prohibit these dogs from being used in organised fights and in 1935 the American Kennel Club recognised Pit Bull Terriers as Staffordshire Terriers.

The name "Staffordshire Bull Terrier" was first used in Britain in 1930 in advertisements for bull-and-terrier-type dogs. Organised dog fighting had been effectively eliminated in the United Kingdom by the Protection of Animals Act 1911, but devotees of the bull-and-terrier type continued to breed these dogs, predominantly in England's Black Country. Throughout the early 1930s attempts were made in England to gain recognition for these dogs with The Kennel Club, these efforts were successful in 1935. In order to avoid confusion with the British breed, in 1972 the American Kennel Club changed the name of their American breed to the American Staffordshire Terrier.

Despite criminalisation, illegal fights using pit bull-type dogs have continued to be widespread in the United States, in the 1990s in that country it was estimated 1,500 dogs died annually in organised fights and by the mid-2000s it was estimated over 40,000 people were involved in the illegal blood sport. Pit bull-type dogs are also used by criminal organisations to guard illegal narcotics, and to intimidate and attack civilians, other criminals and police, the type becoming a status symbol in American gang culture. On the other side of the law, pit bull-type dogs have been used by U.S. Customs and Border Protection as drug detection dogs.

There is a lobby of animal rights groups that are spending millions of dollars to try to rebrand pit bulls as family dogs. In efforts to counter negative perceptions about pit bull-type dogs, both the San Francisco Society for the Prevention of Cruelty to Animals and the New York City Center for Animal Care and Control have unsuccessfully attempted to rename the type.

Identification 
Studies have found that when people involved in dog rescue, adoption, and regulation identify the breed of a dog of mixed parentage, this identification did not always correlate with the DNA analysis of that dog. Mixed-breed dogs are often labeled as pit bulls if they have certain physical characteristics, such as a square-shaped head or bulky body type.

Dog attack and death risk 

A 2000 joint review project between researchers in the Centers for Disease Control and Prevention (CDC), Humane Society of the United States (HSUS) and American Veterinary Medical Association (AVMA) found the data indicated that Rottweilers and pit bull-type dogs accounted for 67% of human dog bite-related fatalities in the United States between 1997 and 1998, and followed with "It is extremely unlikely that they accounted for anywhere near 60% of dogs in the United States during that same period and, thus, there appears to be a breed-specific problem with fatalities." Pit bull-type dogs were identified in approximately one-third of dog bite-related fatalities in the United States between 1981 and 1992. The review notes that studies on dog bite-related fatalities which collect information by surveying news reports are subject to potential errors, as some fatal attacks may not have been reported, a study might not find all relevant news reports, and the dog breed might be misidentified.

In a 2021 review of 19 retrospective dog bite studies from U.S. Level I trauma centers, pit bulls were found to inflict a higher prevalence and severity of injuries compared with other breeds. A 2020 literature review in Plastic and Reconstructive Surgery found that from 1971 to 2018 of all pure breed dogs in the United States, pit bull-type breeds were second, behind the German Shepherd, and ahead of Labradors, Chow Chows, and Rottweilers (in that order) for the most bites severe enough to require hospital treatment. The study found that the proportion of bites caused by German Shepherds decreased by 0.63 percent per year over that time interval while the proportion caused by pit bulls increased by 1.17 percent per year. The pit bull proportion of dog bites increased more slowly in Denver, Colorado, where breed-specific legislation had been in place.

In a 2014 literature review of dog bite studies, the American Veterinary Medical Association (AVMA) argues that breed is a poor sole predictor of dog bites. Some controlled studies have not identified pit bulls as disproportionately dangerous, while others have found that compared with other dog breeds they are far more likely to attack unprovoked and often go off property to do so. Pit bull-type dogs are more frequently identified with cases involving very severe injuries or fatalities than other breeds, but a 2007 study suggested this may relate to the popularity of the breed, noting that sled dogs, such as Siberian Huskies, were involved in a majority of fatal dog attacks in some areas of Canada. Bite statistics by breed are no longer tracked by the CDC, and are discouraged by the AVMA and the American Society for the Prevention of Cruelty to Animals (ASPCA).

Pit bulls were originally bred for bull baiting and dog fighting, and because of this heritage, they often show a tendency to attack other animals with a remarkable ferocity that contributes to public stigma against the breed. In fighting with dogs of other breeds, pit bulls, German Shepherds, Great Danes and Rottweilers were often the aggressor, and more than twenty percent of studied Akitas, Jack Russell Terriers and pit bulls displayed serious aggression towards other dogs. Although there may be a connection between breed of dog and aggression towards humans, the difficulty of classifying dog attacks by specific breed after the fact has made this point controversial and debated. Violent interactions between humans and canines have been studied by the U.S. government, notably the Centers for Disease Control and Prevention (CDC), as well as academic veterinary researchers. The interpretation of these studies, breed identification and relevance issues, and variable circumstances have given rise to intense controversy. Additionally, researchers on both sides of the pit bull debate rarely disclose when they are being funded by lobbyists, leading to a risk that the scientific literature on pit bulls has been influenced by money.

Pit bulls are known for their tenacity and refusal to release a bite, even in the face of great pain. A popular myth mischaracterized pit bulls as having "locking jaws." The refusal to let go is a behavioral, not physiological trait, and there is no locking mechanism in a pit bull's jaws. Pit bull-type dogs, like other terriers, hunting and bull-baiting breeds, can exhibit a bite, hold, and shake behavior and at times refuse to release. Pit bulls also have wide skulls, well-developed facial muscles, and strong jaws, and some research suggests that pit bull bites are particularly serious because they tend to bite deeply and grind their molars into tissue. Breaking an ammonia ampule and holding it up to the dog's nose can cause the dog to release its hold.

In animal shelters 
Many people consider pit bulls undesirable, making it harder for animal shelters to adopt them out. Surveys have found that animal shelter workers intentionally misidentify pit bulls to improve their adoption rates, or to avoid euthanizing them in jurisdictions where they are banned. Animal advocates recommend that shelters stop labeling breeds to improve pit bull adoption rates. Pit bulls also have higher rates of unsuccessful adoptions, and are more likely than other kinds of dogs to be returned to a shelter multiple times and eventually euthanized. Whether pit bull adoptions fail more often than other types of dog due to breed behavioral traits, or due to public stigma, is not known, but in general the most common reasons why shelter dog adoptions fail are behavioral problems or incompatibility with the adopter's existing pets.

Breed-specific legislation 

Widely reported pit bull attacks have resulted in the enactment of breed-specific legislation (BSL) in several jurisdictions. In two cases, breed-specific bans have been reversed by city councils. 

Breed-specific legislation has been largely found to be ineffective at reducing the number of dog attacks. Research has indicated that there is resistance by those who work in the adoption industry, applying a sharper distinction before allowing a dog to be labelled as a pit bull, as well as objections from veterinarians.

Many of the jurisdictions that restrict pit bulls apply their restriction to the modern American Pit Bull Terrier, American Staffordshire Terrier, Staffordshire Bull Terrier, and any other dog that has the substantial physical characteristics and appearance of those breeds.  Such jurisdictions include the Canadian province of Ontario, and the American city of Miami. Denver,  Colorado lifted its longstanding ban on the breed in 2021 following a referendum that voted to repeal the ban.

However, a few jurisdictions, such as Singapore, also classify the modern American Bulldog as a "pit bull-type dog". In the United Kingdom, a pit bull is an American Pit Bull Terrier.

Courts in the United States and Canada have ruled that expert identification, when using published breed standards, is sufficient for the enforcement of breed-specific legislation.

Debates often center on whether apparent aggressive tendencies are the result of poor dog ownership or natural behaviors of the breed.

In England and Wales, the Dangerous Dogs Act of 1991 prohibits the ownership of American Pit Bull Terriers, along with three other breeds; the Act also bans the breeding, sale and exchange of these dogs. Similar legislation exists in Australia. Under Irish law, American Pit Bull Terriers must be led by someone at least 16 years of age, kept on a short strong lead, be muzzled, and wear a collar bearing the name and address of their owner in public at all times. In Germany the importation of pit bulls is banned.

Commercial restrictions

Liability insurance 
Dog owners in the United States can be held legally liable for injuries inflicted or caused by their dogs. In general, owners are considered liable if they were unreasonably careless in handling or restraining the dog, or if they knew beforehand that the dog had a tendency to cause injury (e.g., bite); however, dog owners are automatically considered liable if local laws hold an owner strictly liable for all damage caused by their dog, regardless of carelessness or foreknowledge of a dog's tendencies. Homeowners and renters insurance policies typically provide liability coverage from US$100,000–300,000 for injuries inflicted by dogs; however, some insurance companies limit their exposure to dog bite liability claims by putting restrictions on dog owners that they insure. These restrictions include refusing to cover dog bites under the insurance policy, increasing insurance rates for homeowners with specific breeds, requiring owners of specific breeds to take special training or have their dogs pass the American Kennel Club Canine Good Citizen test, requiring owners to restrict their dogs with muzzles, chains, or enclosures, and refusing to write policies for homeowners or renters who have specific breeds of dogs.

Owners of rental properties may also be held liable if they knew an aggressive dog was living on their property and they did nothing to ensure the safety of other tenants at the property; as a result, many rental properties forbid pit bull-type dogs and any other breeds if the rental property's insurance will not cover damage inflicted by that type of dog. The dog breeds most often not covered by insurance companies include pit bull-type dogs, Rottweilers, German Shepherd Dogs, Doberman Pinschers, Akitas (Akita Inu and American Akitas), and Chow Chows.

In 2013, Farmers Insurance notified policyholders in California that it will no longer cover bites by pit bulls, Rottweilers and wolf-dog hybrids. A spokeswoman for Farmers said that those breeds account for more than a quarter of the agency's dog bite claims.

Air carrier restrictions 

Several air carriers embargo certain brachycephalic dog breeds. The following table has a sampling of air carrier embargoes on dogs.

Notable pit bulls 

Sallie Ann Jarrett, the mascot of the 11th Pennsylvania Infantry Regiment during the American Civil War.

 Nipper, a mongrel at times referred to as a pit bull, though commonly seen as a non pit bull-type terrier, is the dog in Francis Barraud's painting His Master's Voice.

Pete the Pup, a character from the movie series The Little Rascals, was played by pit bull-type dogs. 

Sergeant Stubby, a dog of disputed breed who served for the 102nd Infantry, 26th (Yankee) Division during World War I, has been called a pit bull.

21st century dogs include Star, who, while protecting her owner, was shot by police in a video that went viral, and Daddy, dog trainer Cesar Millan's right-hand dog, who was known for his mellow temperament and his ability to interact calmly with ill-mannered dogs.

As symbol
Owning dogs like pit bulls and rottweilers can be seen as a symbol of power. In 2005, two American lawyers used a pit bull logo and the phone number 1-800-PIT-BULL in a television advertisement to convey that they were "especially fierce litigators". The Supreme Court of Florida ruled that this use was in breach of Florida Bar advertising rules. White supremacist groups such as the Keystone State Skinheads have used a graphic of a pit bull as their logo. The Anti-Defamation League lists the pit bull under "General Hate Symbols."

Pit bulls have appeared in the logo of Brown Shoe Company. The above mentioned Nipper appeared in the logo of RCA.

References 

Catch dogs
Dog breeds originating in England
Dog breeds originating in the United States
Dog fighting breeds
Dog types